Dhieu Abwok Deing (born 28 August 2001) is an American-South Sudanese basketball player for the Cape Town Tigers. He played college basketball for the USC Aiken Pacers, Dodge City CC Conquistadors, and UTSA Roadrunners.

College career
In his freshmen year with the USC Aiken, Deing averaged 11.6 points and 4.3 rebounds per game. He transferred to Dodge City Community College, where he averaged 19.1 points and 4.7 rebounds in his sophomore year. Following the season, he transferred to UTSA, where he averaged 13.6 points and 5.3 rebounds per game in his junior season. Deing later declared for the 2022 NBA draft and decided to forego his remaining college eligibility.

Professional career 
In August 2022, Deing joined the Cape Town Tigers and helped them win the South African national championship.

National team career
Deing was on the South Sudan men's national basketball team for AfroBasket 2021. He contributed 11.2 points per game, helping the team reach the quarterfinals of the tournament.

Career statistics

College

NCAA Division I

|-
| style="text-align:left;"| 2021–22
| style="text-align:left;"| UTSA
| 25 || 13 || 27.2 || .407 || .299 || .754 || 5.3 || 1.5 || 1.3 || .2 || 13.6

NCAA Division II

|-
| style="text-align:left;"| 2019–20
| style="text-align:left;"| USC Aiken
| 29 || 15 || 28.4 || .423 || .342 || .794 || 4.3 || 1.1 || .8 || .7 || 11.6

JUCO

|-
| style="text-align:left;"| 2020–21
| style="text-align:left;"| Dodge City CC
| 22 || 21 || 32.8 || .391 || .338 || .753 || 4.7 || 2.2 || 1.9 || .2 || 19.1

References

External links
UTSA Roadrunners bio
Dodge City CC Conquistadors bio
USC Aiken Pacers bio

2001 births
Shooting guards
South Sudanese men's basketball players
American men's basketball players
UTSA Roadrunners men's basketball players
Living people
Cape Town Tigers players
People from Lafayette, Louisiana
USC Aiken Pacers men's basketball players
Basketball players from Louisiana
American people of South Sudanese descent
American sportspeople of African descent
Sportspeople of South Sudanese descent
South Sudanese expatriate sportspeople in South Africa